The 1998 Lower Saxony state election was held on 1 March 1998 to elect the members of the 14th Landtag of Lower Saxony. The incumbent Social Democratic Party (SPD) government led by Minister-President Gerhard Schröder was returned with an increased majority. Schröder was subsequently re-elected as minister-president.

Schröder took the election as a test run for a potential Bundestag election in September. He said that if SPD would receive less that 42 percent of the vote, he would withdraw his nomination. Achieving 47.9 percent of the vote, he proceeded to run for Bundestag as SPD's ultimately successful Chancellor candidate.

Parties
The table below lists parties represented in the 13th Landtag of Lower Saxony.

Election result

|-
! colspan="2" | Party
! Votes
! %
! +/-
! Seats 
! +/-
! Seats %
|-
| bgcolor=| 
| align=left | Social Democratic Party (SPD)
| align=right| 2,068,477
| align=right| 47.9
| align=right| 3.6
| align=right| 83
| align=right| 2
| align=right| 52.9
|-
| bgcolor=| 
| align=left | Christian Democratic Union (CDU)
| align=right| 1,549,227
| align=right| 35.9
| align=right| 0.5
| align=right| 62
| align=right| 5
| align=right| 39.5
|-
| bgcolor=| 
| align=left | Alliance 90/The Greens (Grüne)
| align=right| 304,193
| align=right| 7.0
| align=right| 0.4
| align=right| 12
| align=right| 1
| align=right| 7.6
|-
! colspan=8|
|-
| bgcolor=| 
| align=left | Free Democratic Party (FDP)
| align=right| 209,610
| align=right| 4.9
| align=right| 0.5
| align=right| 0
| align=right| ±0
| align=right| 0
|-
| bgcolor=|
| align=left | The Republicans (REP)
| align=right| 118,975
| align=right| 2.8
| align=right| 0.9
| align=right| 0
| align=right| ±0
| align=right| 0
|-
| bgcolor=|
| align=left | Others
| align=right| 64,450
| align=right| 1.5
| align=right| 
| align=right| 0
| align=right| ±0
| align=right| 0
|-
! align=right colspan=2| Total
! align=right| 4,314,932
! align=right| 100.0
! align=right| 
! align=right| 157
! align=right| 4
! align=right| 
|-
! align=right colspan=2| Voter turnout
! align=right| 
! align=right| 73.8
! align=right| 0.0
! align=right| 
! align=right| 
! align=right| 
|}

References

Sources
 The Federal Returning Officer

1998
Lower Saxony
March 1998 events in Europe